Barleylands Farm Park and Craft Village is located in Barleylands, Billericay, Essex. It has a wide range of farm animals, indoor play, outdoor play, tractor rides, small rides, birds of prey centre and brand new for 2020 the Nocturnal and Exotic's House. They are well known for their animal care, popular children's birthday parties and events such as Lambing Live, Easter and Toddler Fireworks.

Attractions and services 

They now have animals such as fruit bats, skunks, snakes, tree frogs and more in their new Nocturnal and Exotic's house.

Other attractions within the farm include indoor and outdoor play areas, go-karts, tractor rides and a large undercover sandpit.

The farm's "Discovery Barn" is home to vintage tractors and interactive exhibits, showcasing farming's history.

The farm's Craft Village was opened in 2003, hosting craft workshops and individually-owned craft-based business. The Village is located next to the Farm Park, and events are held throughout the year.

Situated on level ground the Barleylands campsite has electric points, toilet and shower facilities with disabled access. Available for both private hire and members of the camping and caravaning club.

Barleylands has two conference rooms available for meetings, workshops and parties. The showground can also be hired for outside events.

Events 

Farmers Markets are no longer held at Barleylands. Instead events are organized throughout the year that have a range of stalls including food and crafts to browse. These events are held with The Village and are free to enter for visitors.

The Barleylands showground is used by both local sports teams for training and matches, wedding hire, plus local residents who take part in the regular boot sales and events at the farm.

Essex Country Show
The Farm hosted the annual Essex Country Show on the 2nd weekend in September, from 1986 to 2016.

Founded in 1986, the Essex Country Show celebrated all aspects of agricultural history and rural life.  Over 50 crafters demonstrated such skills as spinning, hurdle making and blacksmiths, and rare skills like coracle-making and clog-making. Animal displays included heavy horses, a sheep shearing show, working dogs and small animal displays. The show included 50 working steam engines and 60 model engines, vintage tractors, cars and motorcycles, model boats on the lake, a threshing demonstration, a specialist food hall, music, arena events, craft marquees, amusements, funfair and trade stands.

The show was axed in 2016 due to increasing operating costs.

References

External links
 Barleylands Farm Park and Craft Village - official site

Museums in Essex
Farm museums in England